The Wairarapa Line is a secondary railway line in the south-east of the North Island of New Zealand.

The first part of the line opened in 1874 between Wellington and Lower Hutt, with the entire line to Woodville completed in 1897. It was the only New Zealand Government Railways route out of Wellington until 1908, when the government bought out the Wellington and Manawatu Railway Company who owned and operated the present North Island Main Trunk section between Wellington and Palmerston North. The line originally included the famous Rimutaka Incline, which used the Fell mountain railway system to cross the Rimutaka Range between Upper Hutt and Featherston. In the mid-1950s, the line between Petone and Featherston was substantially realigned, with the line diverted to the east of the Hutt River between Petone and Haywards to serve new housing developments in Lower Hutt, and the construction of the Rimutaka Tunnel to replace the Rimutaka Incline. Part of the former route west of the Hutt River has been retained as the Melling Branch.

The southern portion of the line between Wellington and Upper Hutt is electrified and is also known as the Hutt Valley Line. Transdev on behalf of the Greater Wellington Regional Council runs suburban services along the Hutt Valley section, as well as the Wairarapa Connection service between Wellington and Masterton. KiwiRail runs regular freight services along the line between Wellington to Masterton and between Pahiatua and Woodville. No regular services currently run along the Masterton to Pahiatua section, and this section is currently under review as part of KiwiRail's turnaround plan.

The Labour Party promised during the 2017 election campaign to upgrade the track to improve operation of the Wairarapa Connection, and on 9 October 2018 the Minister of Transport Phil Twyford announced that the proposed $196 million for the region included $96 million for the Wairarapa Line; $50 million in the Wairarapa and $46.2 million south of the Rimutaka Tunnel including double-tracking the Trentham to Upper Hutt section. Work is to start in April 2019. The double-tracking will be completed in 2021. Other "infrastructure renewals" on the line include three bridges with timber elements and track renewal (including in the Rimutaka Tunnel), replacement  of signals between Masterton and Featherston and upgrades to Upper Hutt. Passing loops at Carterton and Woodside had previously been removed, leaving Featherston with the only loop between Upper Hutt and Masterton; the Carterton loop may need reinstating at some time for more frequent trains. The New Zealand Upgrade Programme announced on 30 January 2020 included passing loops at Carterton, Featherston and Maymorn and a second platform at Featherston. It is planned to have up to 7 peak services from Masterton at 15-minute intervals.

Construction
Proposals for railed transportation out of Wellington were made as early as the start of the 1850s, barely a decade after European settlement of the area began. In 1853 and 1857, investigation of horse-hauled tramways was undertaken, but no action was taken. Robert Stokes, a member of the provincial government, proposed a railway over the Rimutakas in 1858 and finally succeeded in gaining government interest in 1863. The Wellington Provincial Government established a committee to investigate proposals, and on 2 July 1866, it passed the Wellington, Hutt and Wairarapa Railway Ordinance.

In 1870, Julius Vogel included a Wellington-Wairarapa railway in his Great Public Works Policy and visited London to arrange a loan to finance the policy. On this trip, he was approached by several contracting firms and a contract that included the first section of the Wairarapa Line was awarded to Brogden & Sons. The construction of the line can be considered in three stages: the Hutt Valley section, the route over the Rimutakas, and the line through the Wairarapa via Masterton to Woodville.

Hutt Valley section

On 20 August 1872, construction of the Wairarapa Line began with the turning of the first sod at Pipitea Point, the site of Wellington's first railway station. Construction was delayed due to the difficulties associated with building a railway along the narrow, rocky shoreline of Wellington Harbour, and the section to Lower Hutt was not opened until 14 April 1874. Further difficulties were encountered in building the rest of the route up the Hutt Valley along the Hutt River's western bank, including the need to divert the river and reinforce its bank in places. On 1 February 1876 the line opened to Upper Hutt. On 28 December 1877 the line to Kaitoke was officially opened by the Governor,. On 1 January 1878 the line to Kaitoke was opened to the public; becoming the railhead for the Wairarapa for nearly ten months (to 16 October).

Rimutaka section

The Rimutaka Range posed a severe difficulty to those involved in planning and constructing the Wairarapa Line. However, from Summit down the eastern slope to Cross Creek near Featherston, a gradient of 1 in 14-16 was required. This was far too steep for regular steam locomotives to handle, and accordingly the Fell mountain railway system was employed. This used a centre rail to which specially-designed locomotives and brake vans clung, allowing them to climb the steep slope upwards or control the descent. Despite the terrain, construction of this unique route was completed swiftly, opening to Featherston on 12 October 1878.

South Wairarapa section
Construction from Featherston to Masterton across the Wairarapa plains north of Lake Wairarapa was relatively easy. The decision was taken to bypass Greytown and build the line through Woodside to bridge the Waiohine River at a point far enough up the river to be considered safe; a line through Greytown would have required a bridge at a point considered unsafe by the surveyors. The Greytown Branch was constructed from Woodside, and Greytown was briefly the effective terminus of the Wairarapa Line from the opening of the branch on 14 May 1880 until the bridging of the Waiohine a month later. Later in 1880, the line opened all the way through to Masterton.

North Wairarapa section
The northern Wairarapa was more rugged and isolated, and construction was slower and more difficult. Construction of the  section to Newman was inexplicably slow, not completed until 1896.

Branch Lines
Four branch lines diverge from the Wairarapa Line: the Melling Branch and the Gracefield Branch to Hutt Workshops, both still open; the Greytown Branch, closed in 1953, and the Hutt Park Railway, which ceased serving its intended purpose in 1906 but survived in truncated form as an industrial siding until 1982.  At one time a branch line to Martinborough was proposed but this line never eventuated.

Deviations
Several upgrades and alterations to the Wairarapa Line have been made, but only the Western Hutt and Rimutaka tunnel deviations have significantly altered its route.

Hutt deviation

In 1925, construction began on what was then known as the Hutt Valley Branch, leaving the main line just north of Petone station and running east to Waterloo, opening on 26 May 1927. After World War II, new state housing suburbs developed north of Waterloo, and the railway was extended to serve them. In 1954, it re-joined the western line south of Manor Park and superseded the old route. On 1 March 1954 the former Hutt Valley Branch became part of the Wairarapa Line. The western route was truncated into the Melling Branch from Petone, with the Lower Hutt railway station becoming the Western Hutt railway station.

Silversteam deviation
The deviation included a new bridge across the Hutt River, replacing a section of line now used by Silver Stream Railway

Rimutaka deviation

The Rimutaka Incline was difficult, costly and time-consuming to operate, but as the Wairarapa Line had become a secondary route since the acquisition of the Wellington and Manawatu Railway in 1908, its replacement was not a priority. Various alternate systems and routes were debated, with a tunnel chosen in 1936. However, the economic conditions left from the Great Depression followed by the impact of World War II meant that work on the tunnel did not start until 1948. The Incline and the line up the western side of the Rimutakas closed on 29 October 1955 and the tunnel opened on 3 November 1955.

Operation

Passenger services

When the full line opened in 1897, passenger services from the Hutt Valley to Wellington were augmented by NZR's first express from Wellington, the Napier Express (the WMR had operated the Wellington-Longburn portion of the New Plymouth Express). After the acquisition of the WMR, the Napier Express was re-routed to the quicker west coast route in early 1909 and the Wairarapa Mail was introduced to provide a regular service through the Wairarapa to Woodville. In 1936, RM class Wairarapa railcars were introduced; these were designed to operate at speed over the Rimutaka Incline and provided a much quicker service to Wellington and local Wairarapa services. They originally augmented the Wairarapa Mail but replaced it in 1948. Carriage trains operated only at peak times of the year when the railcar capacity was exceeded; in 1955, the Incline's closure meant the Wairarapa railcars were withdrawn and 88 seater railcars were introduced, boosting capacity at off-peak times. One Wairarapa railcar has survived and is currently under restoration by the Pahiatua Railcar Society. Mixed trains also operated until the 1950s.

In the 1950s, the Hutt Valley line was electrified using the 1500 V DC system already operating from Wellington to Johnsonville and Paekakariki. The electrification was opened to Taitā on 12 October 1953 and Upper Hutt on 24 July 1955, allowing for a more intensive suburban commuter service to Wellington. Originally operated by DM/D class electric multiple units and carriage trains hauled by ED and EW class electric locomotives, the carriage trains and many of the DM/D units were phased out upon the introduction of the "Ganz-Mavag" EM/ET class units in the early 1980s. The "Matangi" FP/FT class was introduced on the Hutt Valley Line in 2011–12, initially relegating the Ganz Mavag units to peak services only before being completely replacing them from 2015.

Railcar services were withdrawn in 1977, and carriage trains were re-instated progressively from early 1964. Until 1963, a railcar service operated on Friday evenings between Masterton and Woodville, and in December that year the decision was taken to replace the morning railcar to Wellington with a carriage train as over 200 passengers wished to use the railcar service that had a capacity of just 176. The final railcar service was replaced by carriage trains in December 1977; some of the carriage trains from this point until the mid-1980s were made up of de-motorised former 88-seater railcars known as "grassgrubs" in New Zealand railfan jargon. Passenger services through the lowly populated northern Wairarapa survived due to the poor roads in the area, but as they were improved, demand for the trains declined. Masterton – Palmerston North passenger trains ceased from Monday, 1 August 1988 with the last such service running on Friday, 29 July. In the 1990s, the service between Masterton and Wellington was rebranded as the Wairarapa Connection and presently operates five times each way weekdays (with a sixth service in the evening on Fridays), and twice each way on weekends and public holidays. In 2007, eighteen new SW class carriages were introduced to replace the 56ft carriages used since the service's inception; in 2013, they were joined by the six SE class to relieve capacity constraints especially on evening services.

The Wellington Metro Rail Upgrade project (2020-2021) started in November 2019; and is expected to take eighteen months and cost $300 million. The single-track Trentham-Upper Hutt section will be double-tracked and equipped for bi-directional signalling so that trains can run on either track in either direction between Upper Hutt and Trentham (and possibly later to Heretaunga). Signalling, track and three bridges will be renewed, and a longer loop at Upper Hutt will hold longer Wairarapa log trains. The work is expected to improve the operation of both suburban passenger trains to Upper Hutt and the Wairarapa Connection.

Freight services
Until the acquisition of the WMR in December 1908, all NZR freight out of Wellington was carried on the Wairarapa Line. As soon as the western route became available, all freight that could be diverted off the Wairarapa Line was diverted, due to the difficulties created by the Rimutaka Incline. This meant that even some traffic from the northern Wairarapa was sent through the Manawatu Gorge and down the west coast to Wellington. The opening of the Rimutaka Tunnel made the line more desirable for through freight traffic, but as localised freight gave way to containerised inter-city freight in the 1980s, the significance of the Wairarapa Line declined, especially on the section north of Masterton.

KiwiRail is currently investigating a log shipment hub in Masterton that would mean log traffic would use the northern portion of the Wairarapa Line, from Masterton to Napier.

In February 2012, it was reported that the total freight carried on the northern section of the line had increased from 74,031 tonnes in 2009 to 97,139 tonnes in 2011, although this figure was inflated by a ten-day closure of the Manawatu Gorge section of the railway line due to a slip.

Presently freight services operate at each end of the line. Log and other wood-related traffic is moved between Wellington and Waingawa, just south of Masterton, with one overnight and one daylight return service on weekdays, and a daylight service operates both weekend days. Two freight trains operate from Palmerston North to Pahiatua and return on weekdays, the first in the early hours of the morning and the second in the afternoon. No freights currently operate regularly at weekends.

KiwiRail ceased running timetabled revenue services on the Masterton–Pahiatua section of the line in February 2015, transferring the Sunday Wellington to Palmerston North via Woodville run to the NIMT.  However, they have undertaken to keep it open and maintain it to an operational standard, in part because it is still in use by heritage operators, particularly the Pahiatua Railcar Society and Steam Incorporated.

Rolling stock

In the late nineteenth century, the first members of the K class to operate in the North Island were transferred from the South Island to work the Napier Express. They were augmented by members of the M and N classes. In the twentieth century, typical locomotives included members of the A and AB class. The Rimutaka Incline was almost always operated by the six members of the H class built specifically for it. In 1906 E 66 was built for the Incline but did not prove as successful as the six H locomotives and was retired in 1917.

When the Rimutaka Tunnel opened in November 1955, the Wairarapa Line became the first in New Zealand to be fully dieselised as steam locomotives were unable to pass through the tunnel. Initially, DE and DG class diesels were employed, and they were soon joined by the DA class. Until 1967, the Wairarapa Line was the only way DA class locomotives could access Wellington due to tunnels south of Paekakariki being too small.

In the 1980s, the DG class had been fully withdrawn and the DA class in the process of withdrawal or conversion to the DC class; accordingly motive power on the Wairarapa Line changed. Until 2015, the DC class was the mainstay of the Wairarapa line south of Masterton, with locomotives of the DBR, DF/DFT and DX classes occasionally used. In July 2015, the DFT class took over services on the line.

As of November 2021, rolling stock regularly used on the Wairarapa Line include:

Future
Improvements planned for the Wairarapa Line beyond Upper Hutt from 2021 to 2024 include track renewals with full renewal in the Remutaka and Maoribank tunnels, renewals of timber elements in three bridges, refurbishments of some level crossings and drainage and vegetation clearing.

In November 2021, Greater Wellington Regional Council proposed the purchase of tri-mode multiple units for the line, similar to bi-mode multiple units used overseas.

Electrification 
Proposals have been made to extend the electrification into the Wairarapa and the Rimutaka Tunnel was constructed to allow overhead lines to be installed, although before opening diesel operation was adopted. In 2007, the Greater Wellington Regional Council rejected a call for the line to be electrified to Masterton, stating that patronage was too low to justify the capital expenditure.

In May 2021, KiwiRail, Beca and Systra published the North Island Electrification Study, which put forward two options for electrification expansion for the Wairarapa Line from Upper Hutt to Masterton:
 Option 1: electrify the entire section at 25kV AC (same system as Auckland and central NIMT), with a voltage changeover at Upper Hutt;
 Option 2: use battery-electric EMUs with two 7km long overhead segments around Featherston and Masterton at 1600V DC.
The estimated costs of option 1 was $226m, with option 2 being $82m.

Signalling
The Wairarapa line used four of the six New Zealand railway signalling systems: Double Line Automatic (DLA), Centralised Traffic Control (CTC), Track Warrant Control (TWC) and Station Limits. Signalling at Petone is future-proofed for conversion to a fifth system, Automatic Signalling Rules (ASR).

The Wairarapa Line had a number of lasts for railway signalling in New Zealand
 Semaphore Signal on an operational line, these were decommissioned in 1996 however the masts (poles) remained in place until July 2014.
 Line controlled by Tyers Electric Train Tablet
 Manned signal box outside of a major station

Prior to the Trentham–Upper Hutt–Featherston section being transferred to Train Control in February 2007, this was the last section with CTC controlled by a signalman. Part-time signal boxes remained at Petone (weekday peak and inter-peak) and at Taitā (weekday peak) until December 2013 and July 2014 respectively, when signalling was switched to Train Control in central Wellington.

Masterton is a unique signalling arrangement with Track Warrant Control ending at 'TWC Ends' boards north of the two-position home signal, which allows shunting movements to be carried out without the need for a Track Warrant. Along with Horotiu (on the NIMT between Te Rapa and Ngāruawāhia) Masterton still has Woods Points Keys. The Horotiu ones are not in regular use.

Heritage

Seven railway preservation organisations are based on or close by the Wairarapa Line.

New Zealand Railway and Locomotive Society

NZRLS has a workshop based at the northern end of the Silver Stream Railway where members restoring two Wellington and Manawatu Railway Company carriages. It also has an archives building beside Ava railway station in Lower Hutt.

Silver Stream Railway

The Silver Stream Railway is a heritage railway in Silversteam, Wellington.
It regularly operates preserved New Zealand Railways Department locomotives along a restored section of the Hutt Valley Line (part of the Wairarapa Line), deviated in 1954.

Rimutaka Incline Railway Heritage Trust

The Rimutaka Incline Railway Heritage Trust is based at Maymorn railway station and its ultimate goal is to return the Rimutaka Incline to full operational condition as a tourist attraction.

Fell Engine Museum

The Fell Engine Museum is a short walk from Featherston station and includes preserved H 199, the sole Fell steam locomotive (NZR H class) left in the world. The museum also has a Fell brake van and other railway-related items of historical significance.

Woodside Station Preservation Society
The Woodside Station Preservation Society focuses its activities on the Woodside railway station Building.

Wairarapa Railway Restoration Society

The Wairarapa Railway Restoration Society focuses its activities on the Historic Carterton railway station complex, which includes a museum inside Carterton's historic station building, rolling stock in the station yard, and other heritage items.

Pahiatua Railcar Society

The Pahiatua Railcar Society is at Pahiatua railway station, which is no longer served by passenger trains but maintained by the society. It has the only surviving Wairarapa and 88-seater railcars and is restoring them to operational condition; it also has an operational Standard railcar.

Features

Stations

Private sidings
Currently the only private sidings in use are Jukken Nisho at Waingawa and Fonterra at Pahiatua. The sidings remain at Taratahi but the main line points were removed around 2003 (Ravensdown Fertiliser). Lime Works at Mauriceville are also still connected to the network but are overgrown and covered with lime.  The former siding at Eurocell (Parapine) in Upper Hutt closed in 2012.

Extensive sidings at Petone, Naenae (where the goods shed remains, in non-rail use), Taitā (Unilever) and Trentham (Army) have been closed and removed. Other former sidings include one used by oil companies between Renall St and Masterton stations; disused sidings at Mauriceville and Eketahuna; the Ngauranga Industrial Siding to an abattoir in the Ngauranga Gorge; and a siding to the Featherston Military Camp north of Featherston during World War I.

Tunnels
Nine tunnels have been constructed on the various routes of the Wairarapa Line. Of these, only three are now in use for railway purposes, and only the Wiwaka tunnel in northern Wairarapa (150m; between Mangamahoe & Eketahuna) has remained unaffected by deviations since the line opened.

Five of these tunnels are now part of the Rimutaka Rail Trail: Mangaroa, Pakuratahi, Summit, Siberia and Prices. The Rimutaka Incline Railway project hopes to incorporate these tunnels into its restored railway line across the Rimutaka Ranges.

Original route
From Wellington to Woodville:
 Cruickshanks Tunnel (120m)
 Mangaroa Tunnel (152m)
 Pakuratahi Tunnel (73m)
 Summit Tunnel (584m)
 Siberia Tunnel (108m)
 Prices Tunnel (98m)
 Wiwaka Tunnel (150m)

Current route
From Wellington to Woodville:
 Maoribank Tunnel (572m) (in the Hutt Valley)
 Rimutaka Tunnel (8,798m)
 Wiwaka Tunnel (150m) Now No 3, between Mangamahoe and Eketahuna; summit 286m high

See also
 Wairarapa Connection
 Hutt Valley Line
 Palmerston North - Gisborne Line
 Te Aro Extension
 Pahiatua Railcar Society

References

Citations

Bibliography 

 
  pages 151–162.
 
 Mahoney, J.D. Kings of the Iron Road Palmerston North: Dunmore Press, 1982, pp. 81–88.

External links
 1969 timetable

 Valley Signals

Railway lines in New Zealand
Rail transport in the Wellington Region
Railway lines opened in 1874
3 ft 6 in gauge railways in New Zealand
1874 establishments in New Zealand